Pečice may refer to places:

Pečice (Příbram District), a municipality and village in the Czech Republic
Pečice, Brežice, a village in the Municipality of Brežice, Slovenia
Pečice, Litija, a village in the Municipality of Litija, Slovenia